David Davies may refer to:

Politics
David Davies (industrialist) (1818–1890), also known as David Davies Llandinam, MP for Cardigan, 1874–1885, and Cardiganshire, 1885–1886
David Davies (Australian politician) (c. 1840–1894), politician in colonial Victoria, Australia
David Davies (textile merchant) (1852–1934), Liberal politician, MP for Denbigh 1918–1922
Sir David Davies (dairyman) (1870–1958), Conservative politician
David Lewis Davies (1873–1937), British Member of Parliament for Pontypridd, 1931–1937
Dai Davies (trade unionist) (1909–1998), Labour Party official and general secretary of the ISTC
Dai Davies (politician) (born 1959), Independent Member of the UK Parliament for Blaenau Gwent 2006–2010
David TC Davies (born 1970), Welsh Conservative politician, and British Member of Parliament elected in 2005
David Richard Seaborne Davies (1904–1984), Welsh legal academic, briefly a British Liberal Party Member of Parliament in 1945
David Arthur Saunders Davies (fl. 1840s), British Member of Parliament for Carmarthenshire
David Davies, 1st Baron Davies (1880 – 1944) Welsh Liberal Member of Parliament for Montgomeryshire from 1906 to 1929

Arts, entertainment and journalism
Dave Davies (born 1947), British musician with The Kinks
Dave Davies (reporter) (born 1953), American reporter for the Philadelphia Daily News and radio host on WHYY
David Davies (English actor), English actor
David Davies (Welsh actor) (1906–1974), Welsh actor
David Davies (artist) (1864–1939), Australian artist
David Davies (author) (1741–1819), Welsh author
David Davies (composer) (1810–1875), Welsh composer of "Glan'rafon"
David Davies (harpist) (1817–1855), Welsh harpist
David Davies (musician) (born 1954), British flautist, conductor and composer
Ivor Novello (David Ivor Davies, 1893–1951), Welsh composer and actor
David John Davies (1870–?), Welsh painter
David Joshua Davies (1877–1945), Welsh dramatist
David Lloyd Davies, Welsh singer and poet
David Martin Davies (born c. 1960s), American journalist and broadcaster based and born in Texas
David Stuart Davies (born 1946), editor, writer, and playwright
David Thomas Davies (1876–1962), Welsh dramatist
David Ffrangcon-Davies (1855–1918), Welsh operatic baritone

Sportsmen
David Davies (football administrator) (born 1948), former Executive Director of the (English) Football Association
David Davies (footballer, born 1879) (1879–1956), Brecon F.C., Hereford Town F.C. and Wales international footballer
David Davies (footballer, born 1888) (1888–?), Oldham Athletic F.C. and Wales international footballer
David Davies (rugby league), rugby league footballer of the 1900s, and 1910s for Wales, Merthyr Tydfil, Swinton, and Oldham
David Davies (rugby league, born 1902) (1902–1992), rugby league footballer of the 1920s, and 1930s for Wales, and Broughton, Warrington, Huddersfield and Keighley
David Davies (rugby league, born c. 1915), rugby league footballer of the 1930s, and 1940s for Wales, and Salford
David Davies (swimmer) (born 1985), British long-distance swimmer
David Bailey Davies (1884–1968), Welsh rugby union fullback
David Harris Davies (1877–1944), rugby union footballer of the 1900s for Wales, Tonna, Neath, Glamorgan Police, and Glamorgan
Dai Davies (cricketer) (1896–1976), first-class cricketer for Glamorgan and Wales, and Test umpire 
Dai Davies (sportsman) (1880–1944), rugby union, rugby league, and association footballer for Llanelli (RU), Wales (RL), Swinton, Wales (soccer) and Bolton Wanderers
Dai Davies (footballer, born 1948) (1948–2021), Everton F.C., Wrexham A.F.C. and Wales international goalkeeper
Dai Davies (rugby union) (1925–2003), rugby union footballer of the 1940s, and 1950s for British Lions, Wales, Penygraig, Somerset Police, British Police, Somerset, and Barbarian F.C.
W. J. A. Davies (1890–1967), known as Dave Davies, rugby union footballer, captained England in the 1920s
David Idwal Davies (rugby) (1915–1990), rugby union and rugby league footballer of the 1930s, and 1940s for Wales (RU), Swansea, Wales (RL), and Leeds
John Davies (rugby, born 1941) (David John Davies, 1941–1969), rugby union and rugby league footballer of the 1960s for Wales (RU), Neath, and Leeds (RL)

Sciences
David Davies (electrical engineer) (born 1935), professor of electrical engineering at UCL; MoD Chief Scientific Adviser, 1993–1999
David Christopher Davies (1827–1885), geologist and mining engineer
David G. Davies, microbiologist and associate professor at Binghamton University

Religion
David Davies (archdeacon of Llandaff) (1858–1930), Welsh clergyman
David Davies (Baptist minister) (1800–1856)
David Davies (Dean of Wellington) (1912–1987), Welsh clergyman in New Zealand
David Davies (Independent minister and magazine editor) (died 1807), Welsh editor of "Y Geirgrawn"
David Davies (Welsh priest) (1742–1819), Welsh clergyman in the Church of England
David Charles Davies (1826–1891), nonconformist clergyman
David Christopher Davies (missionary) (1878–1958), Welsh representative of the Baptist Missionary Society
David Edwardes Davies (died 1950), Anglican Bishop of Bangor
D. Jacob Davies (1917–1974), Welsh Unitarian minister
David Stephen Davies (1841–1898), Welsh writer, preacher, and colonist
David Tegfan Davies (1883–1968), Welsh Congregational minister

Peers
David Davies, 1st Baron Davies (1880–1944), Liberal MP for Montgomershire 1906–1929, grandson of the industrialist David Davies (see above)
David Davies, 2nd Baron Davies (1915–1944), major in the Royal Welch Fusiliers
David Davies, 3rd Baron Davies (born 1940), British peer and engineer
 David Garfield Davies, Baron Davies of Coity (1935–2019), British peer and trade union leader

Others
David Davies (Dai'r Cantwr) (1812–1874), Welsh activist sentenced for his part in the Rebecca Riots
David Davies (physician) (1792–1865), Welsh physician
David Gwerfyl Davies (1913–1977), Welsh organist and composer
David James Davies (1893–1956), Welsh economist, industrialist, political activist and internationalist
David Percy Davies (1891–1946), Welsh newspaper editor
David Pettit Davies (1920–2003), British test pilot

See also
David Davis (disambiguation), pronounced the same way
Dai Davies (disambiguation)
Davies